Ireland is ranked 5th of the countries with the highest education in the world from a new survey on 9th February 2023. The levels of Ireland's education are primary, secondary and higher (often known as "third-level" or tertiary) education. In recent years further education has grown immensely with 51% of working age adults having completed higher education by 2020. Growth in the economy since the 1960s has driven much of the change in the education system. For universities there are student service fees (up to €3,000 in 2015), which students are required to pay on registration, to cover examinations, insurance and registration costs.

The Department of Education, under the control of the Minister for Education, is in overall control of policy, funding and direction, while other important organisations are the National Qualifications Authority of Ireland, the Higher Education Authority, and on a local level the Education and Training Boards are the only comprehensive system of government organisation. The Department of Further and Higher Education, Research, Innovation and Science, a new department formed in August 2020, will create policy and control funding for third-level institutions. There are many other statutory and non-statutory bodies that have a function in the education system. As of 2020, Norma Foley is the current Minister for Education and Simon Harris is the current Minister for Further and Higher Education, Research, Innovation and Science.

History
The first state-funded educational institutions in Ireland were established in the 16th century. The first printing press in Ireland was established in 1551, the first Irish-language book was printed in 1571 and Trinity College Dublin was established in 1592.

The Education Act 1695 prohibited Irish Catholics from running Catholic schools in Ireland or seeking a Catholic education abroad, until its repeal in 1782. As a result, highly informal secret operations that met in private homes were established, called "hedge schools." Historians generally agree that hedge schools provided a kind of schooling, occasionally at a high level, for up to 400,000 students in 9000 schools, by the mid-1820s. J. R. R. Adams says the hedge schools testified "to the strong desire of ordinary Irish people to see their children receive some sort of education." Antonia McManus argues that there "can be little doubt that Irish parents set a high value on a Hedge school education and made enormous sacrifices to secure it for their children....[the Hedge schoolteacher was] one of their own". The 1782 repeal of the 1695 penal laws had made the Hedge schools legal, although still not in receipt of funding from the Parliament of Ireland.
  
Formal schools for Catholics under trained teachers began to appear after 1800. Edmund Ignatius Rice (1762-1844) founded two religious institutes of religious brothers: the Congregation of Christian Brothers and the Presentation Brothers. They opened numerous schools, which were visible, legal, and standardised. Discipline was notably strict.

From 1811, the Society for the Promotion of the Education of the Poor of Ireland (Kildare Place Society), started to established a nationwide network of non-profit, non-denominational schools, in part funded through the production and sales of textbooks. By 1831, they were operating 1,621 primary schools, and educating approximately 140,000 pupils.

In 1831, the Stanley letter led to the establishment of the Board of National Education and the National School system using public money. The UK Government appointed the commissioner of national education whose task was to assist in funding primary school construction, teacher training, the producing of textbooks, and funding of teachers.

Hedge schools declined after 1831 as the Catholic bishops preferred this, as the new schools would be largely under the control of the Catholic Church and allow better control of the teaching of Catholic doctrine.

On Saturday 10 September 1966, the Fianna Fáil Education Minister, Donogh O'Malley, famously made his unauthorised speech announcing plans for free second-level education in Ireland. Free second-level education was eventually introduced in September 1967, and is now widely seen as a milestone in Irish history.

21st century
Students must go to schools from ages 6 to 16 or until they have completed three years of second-level of education.
 Under the Constitution of Ireland, parents are not obliged "in violation of their conscience and lawful preference to send their children to schools established by the State, or to any particular type of school designated by the State." However, the parental right to homeschool his/her child has met legal contests over minimum standards in the absence of constitutional provision for State-defined educational standards.

In 1973, the Irish language requirement for a second-level certificate was abandoned. However, the Irish language remains a core subject taught in all public schools with exemptions given to individual pupils on grounds of significant periods lived abroad, or with learning difficulties etc.

While English is the primary medium of instruction at all levels in most schools across the state, in Gaelscoileanna (Irish-language schools), Irish is the primary medium of instruction at all levels and English is taught as a second language.

At third level, most university courses are conducted in English, with only a few Irish language options. Some universities offer courses partly through French, German or Spanish.

Framework

Years

Education is compulsory for all children in Ireland from the ages of six to sixteen or until students have completed three years of second-level education and including one sitting of the Junior Certificate examination. Primary education commonly starts at four to five years old. Children typically enroll in a Junior Infant class at age four or five depending on parental wishes. Some schools enrollment policies have age four by a specific date minimum age requirements.

Pre-school

Most play schools in Ireland are in the private sector. Increasingly, children of working parents, who are below school age; attend a myriad of crèches, play-schools, Montessori schools, etc., which have sprung up in response to the changing needs of modern families. These operate as businesses and may charge often substantial childcare fees. Since 2009, in response to public demand for affordable childcare, children may receive two years free preschool the years prior to starting primary schools under the "Early Childcare and Education Scheme".

Irish language Naíonraí are growing rapidly across Ireland. Nearly 4,000 preschoolers attend 278 preschool groups.

Primary school 

Junior Infants (age 4–5/5–6) (informally known as Low Infants)
Senior Infants (age 5–6/6–7) (informally known as High Infants)
First Class (age 6–7/7–8)
Second Class (age 7–8/8–9)
Third Class (age 8–9/9–10)
Fourth Class (age 9–10/10–11)
Fifth Class (age 10–11/11–12)
Sixth Class (age 11–12/12–13)

Primary school children usually start between 8:30 a.m. and 9:20 a.m. Children finish between 1.10 p.m. and 2 p.m. in Junior & Senior infants, while older children spend another hour in school and finish between 2:10 p.m. and 3 p.m.

Secondary school
Since 1967, secondary school education has been state funded in Ireland.

Junior Cycle
The Junior Cycle is a three-year programme, culminating in the Junior Certificate examination. The Junior Certificate examination is sat in all subjects (usually 10 or 11) in early-June, directly after the end of Third Year. 
First Year (age 12–13/13–14)
Second Year (age 13–14/14–15)
Third Year (age 14–15/15–16)

Transition Year
Transition Year sometimes called Fourth Year (age 15-16/16-17) – depending on school, this may be compulsory, optional or unavailable.

Senior Cycle
The Senior Cycle is a two-year programme to prepare students for the Leaving Certificate examinations. The Leaving Certificate examinations take place directly after the end of Sixth Year, with the first exam being held on the Wednesday following the June public holiday (the first Monday in June).
Fifth Year (age 16–18 or age 15–17 if Transition Year is skipped)
Sixth Year (age 17–19 or age 16–18 if Transition Year is skipped)

To prepare students for the State examination in both the Senior (Leaving Certificate) and Junior (Junior Certificate) cycles, many schools hold Mock Examinations (also known as Pre-Certificate Examinations) around February each year. These "mocks" are not state examinations: independent companies provide the exam papers and marking schemes – and are therefore not mandatory across all schools.

Primary education
The Primary School Curriculum (1999) is taught in all schools. The document is prepared by the National Council for Curriculum and Assessment and leaves to the church authorities (usually the Catholic Church but not universally) the formulation and implementation of the religious curriculum in the schools they control. The curriculum seeks to celebrate the uniqueness of the child:

...as it is expressed in each child's personality, intelligence and potential for development. It is designed to nurture the child in all dimensions of his or her life—spiritual, moral, cognitive, emotional, imaginative, aesthetic, social and physical...

The Primary Certificate Examination (1929–1967) was the terminal examination at this level until the first primary-school curriculum, Curaclam na Bunscoile (1971), was introduced, though informal standardised tests are still performed. The primary school system consists of eight years: Junior and Senior Infants, and First to Sixth Classes. Most children attend primary school between the ages of four and twelve although it is not compulsory until the age of six. A minority of children start school at three.

As recently as 2016, virtually all state-funded primary schools – almost 97 percent – were under church control, with approximately 81% under Roman Catholic control. Irish law allowed schools under church control to consider religion as the main factor in admissions. Oversubscribed schools often chose to admit Catholics over non-Catholics, a situation that created difficulty for non-Catholic families. The United Nations Committee on the Rights of the Child in Geneva asked James Reilly, the Minister for Children at that time, to explain the continuation of preferential access to state-funded schools on the basis of religion. He said that the laws probably needed to change, but noted it may take a referendum because the Irish constitution gives protections to religious institutions. The issue is most problematic in the Dublin area. A petition initiated by a Dublin attorney, Paddy Monahan, received almost 20,000 signatures in favour of overturning the preference given to Catholic children. An advocacy group, Education Equality, planned a legal challenge.

Reforms in recent years, including an increase in the number of schools with multi- and non-denominational patrons, has meant that the number of Roman Catholic patronage state-funded schools has fallen to approximately 80%.

Types of school
Primary education is generally completed at a national school, a multidenominational school, a gaelscoil or a preparatory school.
National schools date back to the introduction of state primary education in 1831. They are usually controlled by a board of management under diocesan patronage and often include a local clergyman. The term "national school" has of late become partly synonymous with primary school in some parts. Recently, there have been calls from many sides for fresh thinking in the areas of funding and governance for such schools, with some wanting them to be fully secularised.
Gaelscoileanna are a recent movement, started in the mid 20th century. The Irish language is the working language in these schools and they can now be found countrywide in English-speaking communities. They differ from Irish-language national schools in Irish-speaking regions in that most are under the patronage of a voluntary organisation, Foras Pátrúnachta na Scoileanna Lán-Ghaeilge, rather than a diocesan patronage. Approximately 6% of primary school children attend Gaelscoils and approximately 3% attend Gaelcholáistí with 187 primary and post-primary schools across the country making it the fastest growing education sector.
Multidenominational schools are another innovation. They are generally under the patronage of a non-profit limited company without share capital. They are often opened due to parental demand and students from all religions and backgrounds are welcome. Many are under the patronage of voluntary organisations such as Educate Together or An Foras Pátrúnachta. At least one proposed school has been approved under the patronage of the regional ETB, who generally run vocational secondary schools. In October 2020, general secretary of Education and Training Boards Ireland Paddy Lavelle confirmed that multidenominational state secondary schools, called State's Education and Training Boards (ETBs) – formerly called vocational schools – were going to phase out a set of Catholic influences such as mandatory graduation masses, displaying Catholic symbols only, and visits from diocesan inspectors, as described in the 'framework for the recognition of religious belief/identities of all students in ETB schools'.
Preparatory schools are independent, fee-charging primary schools that are not reliant on the state for funding. These typically serve to prepare children for entry to fee-charging independent or voluntary secondary schools. Most are under the patronage of a religious order.

As of 2021 mainstream primary schools numbered as follows:

Secondary education
Most students enter secondary school aged 12–13. Most students attend and complete secondary education, with approximately 90% of school-leavers taking the terminal examination, the Leaving Certificate, at age 16–19 (in 6th Year at secondary school). Secondary education is generally completed at one of four types of school:
 Voluntary secondary schools, or just "secondary schools", are owned and managed by religious communities or private organisations. The state funds 90% of teachers' salaries. With respect to other running costs, the vast majority of schools have 95% covered by the state with the balance being made up largely through voluntary contributions from pupils' families, while a minority of schools charge fees for pupils to attend and do not receive state subvention other than teachers' salaries. These schools cater for 57% of secondary pupils.
 Vocational schools are owned and managed by Education and Training Boards, with 93% of their costs met by the state. These schools educate 28% of secondary pupils.
 Comprehensive schools or community schools were established in the 1960s, often by amalgamating voluntary secondary and vocational schools. They are fully funded by the state and run by local boards of management. Nearly 15% of secondary pupils attend such schools.
Grind schools are fee-charging privately run schools outside the state sector, who tend to run only the Senior Cycle curriculum for 5th and 6th Year students as well as a one-year repeat Leaving Certificate programme.

Gaelcholáistí are second-level schools (voluntary, vocational or comprehensive) located within English-speaking communities but in which the Irish language is used as the main medium of education. Approximately 3% of secondary students attend these schools.

In urban areas, there is considerable freedom in choosing the type of school the child will attend. The emphasis of the education system at second level is as much on breadth as on depth; the system attempts to prepare the individual for society and further education or work. This is similar to the education system in Scotland. Although in 2012, the Programme for International Student Assessment (Pisa) found Ireland to be 7th in reading and 20th in mathematics in a world survey at the age of 15.

As of 2021, mainstream post-primary schools numbered as follows:

Types of programme 
The document Rules and Programme for Secondary Schools published by the Department of Education and Skills sets out the minimum standards of education required at this level. Examinations are overseen by the State Examinations Commission. Additional documents set out the standard in each element, module or subject.

 The Junior Cycle builds on the education received at primary level and culminates with the Junior Certificate Examination. Students usually begin this at the age of 12 or 13. The Junior Certificate Examination is taken after three years of study and not before fourteen years of age. It consists of exams in English, Irish, Maths and Science (unless the student has an exemption in one of these) as well as a number of chosen subjects. This is typically a selection of subjects including Art, German, French, Spanish, Italian, Latin, Ancient Greek and Classical Studies, Music, Business Studies, Technology, Home Economics, Materials Technology (Woodwork, Metalwork), History, Geography, Civic Social and Political Education (CSPE), and Religious Education. The selection of optional and compulsory subjects varies from school to school. Most students take around ten examined subjects altogether. Other non-examined classes at Junior Cycle level include Physical Education and Social Personal and Health Education (SPHE).
 Transition Year is a one-year informal course taken by an increasing number of students usually ages 15 or 16. The content of this is left to the school to model on the local needs. It is compulsory in some schools but optional in others. Some schools do not offer it. Students may attend structured classes, but do not cover material relevant to the Senior Cycle or the Leaving Certificate exams, and therefore students who choose not to do this year are in no way academically disadvantaged when entering the Senior Cycle. The range of activities in Transition Year or Fourth Year differs greatly from school to school, but many include activities such as work experience placements, project work, international trips or exchanges and excursions. Students may participate in courses such as creative writing, sailing, film-making, public speaking and so on, or enter competitions in science, fashion, motor sport and others that would normally be too time-consuming for a full-time student. Proponents of TY believe that it allows students an extra year to mature, engage in self-directed learning, explore career options and to choose subjects for senior cycle (the results of the Junior Certificate examination do not become available until midway through September, by which time students not taking Transition Year will already have chosen their classes and begun attending). Opponents believe that a year away from traditional study and the classroom environment can distract students and cause problems when they return to the Senior Cycle. They also believe that the activities undertaken in TY prevent some students from enrolling in this year, as they can be costly and most schools charge a fee of a few hundred euro to cover these activities.
 The Senior Cycle builds on the junior cycle and culminates with the Leaving Certificate Examination. Students normally begin this aged 15–17 the year following the completion of the Junior Cycle or Transition Year. The Leaving Certificate Examination, with required exams in English, Irish, and Maths (barring exemptions), and 3 or 4 optional subjects, is taken after two years of study usually at the ages of 17–19.

Therefore, a typical secondary school will consist of First to Third Year (with the Junior Certificate at the end of Third), the usually optional Transition Year (though compulsory in some schools), and Fifth and Sixth Year (with the Leaving Cert. at the end of Sixth).

The vast majority of students continue from lower level to senior level, with only 12.3% leaving after the Junior Certificate. This is lower than the EU average of 15.2%.

Ireland's secondary students rank above average in terms of academic performance in both the OECD and EU; having reading literacy, mathematical literacy and scientific literacy test scores better than average. Ireland has the second best reading literacy for teenagers in the EU, after Finland.

Third-level education

According to the 2022 US News rankings, Ireland is among the top twenty best countries for education.

Special needs education

The "Education for Persons with Special Educational Needs Act 2004" established the framework for the education of students with special needs.

The National Council for Special Education (NCSE) supports students with physical and intellectual disabilities. Some schools provide specific services to students with disabilities. Students with dyslexia are offered additional supports where funding is available.

Special needs assistant
A Special Needs Assistant (SNA) is a teaching assistant who is specialised in working with young people in the classroom setting who require additional learning support due to disability.

Areas of Disadvantage

The Department of Education and Skills identifies disadvantaged schools and has schemes in place to provide additional assistance to low-income families and families experiencing financial hardship. Available assistance includes an allowance for school clothing and footwear, assistance with purchasing school books (administered by school principals), exemption from examination fees for the Leaving Certificate and Junior Certificate exams, and a 'remote areas boarding grant' that facilitates students living in remote areas to attend secondary school.

Holidays
At primary level, schools are required to open for a minimum of 182 days and 167 at post-primary level. Standard Easter, Christmas and mid-term breaks are published by the Department of Education for the upcoming years. Exact dates vary depending on the school. Generally primary and secondary get similar holidays. The year is broken up into three terms: 
 From the week in which 1 September falls to the week before Christmas. 
 From the week after New Year's Day to the week before Easter Sunday
 From the week after Easter Sunday to the end of June for primary level or end of May/start of June for post-primary level to facilitate state exams starting in June. 
There is a mid-term break (one week off halfway through a term) around the public holiday at the end of October, two weeks off for Christmas: generally the last week in December and the first week in January, another mid-term break in February, two weeks off for Easter and summer holidays. Public Holidays are also taken off.

In 2020, due to the COVID-19 pandemic in Ireland, all schools, colleges, universities and childcare facilities closed in March 2020 and remained closed until the end of August/September 2020.

See also
2010 student protest in Dublin
Young Scientist and Technology Exhibition
List of schools in the Republic of Ireland
List of fee-charging schools in Ireland
List of universities in the Republic of Ireland
National Institute for Higher Education
Institutes of Technology in Ireland
Education controversies in the Republic of Ireland
 Open access in the Republic of Ireland
List of Ireland-related topics

References

Further reading
 Akenson, D. H. with Sean Farren and John Coolahan. "Pre-university education, 1921-84" in J. R. Hill, ed. A New History of Ireland:  Vol. VII Ireland, 1921-84 (1976) pp 711–56 online
 Akenson, Donald H. The Irish Education Experiment: The National System of Education in the Nineteenth Century (1981; 2nd ed 2014)
 Akenson, Donald H. A Mirror to Kathleen's Face: Education in Independent Ireland, 1922–60 (1975)
 Connell, Paul. Parson Priest and Master: National Education in Co. Meath 1824-41 (1995)
 Coolahan, John. Irish Education, History and Structure (Dublin: Institute of Public Administration, 1981).
 Dowling, Patrick J. A history of Irish education: a study in conflicting loyalties (Cork, 1971).
 Dowling, Patrick J. The Hedge Schools of Ireland (1998).
 Farren, Sean. The politics of Irish education 1920-65 (Belfast, 1995).
 Loxley, Andrew, and Aidan Seery, eds. Higher Education in Ireland: Practices, Policies and Possibilities (2014)
 Luce, J. V. Trinity College, Dublin: the first 400 years (Dublin, 1992).
 McDermid, Jane. The Schooling of Girls in Britain and Ireland, 1800-1900 (2012)
  McElligott, T. J. Education in Ireland (Dublin, 1966).
 McManus, Antonia. The Irish Hedge School and its Books, 1695–1831 (Dublin: Four Courts Press, 2002)
 O'Donoghue, Thomas, and Judith Harford, eds. Teacher Preparation in Ireland: History, Policy and Future Directions (2017)
 O'Donoghue, Thomas A. "The Roman Catholic ethos of Irish secondary schools, 1924-62, and its implications for teaching and school organisation" Journal of Educational Administration and History, 22#2 (1990), pp 27–37.
 Raftery, Deirdre, and Susan M. Parkes, eds. Female Education in Ireland, 1700–1900: Minerva or Madonna (Irish Academic Press, 2007).
 Raftery, Mary, and O'Sullivan, Eoin. Suffer the little children: the inside story of Ireland's industrial schools (Dublin, 1999).
 Walsh, B. (2021) 'More sinn'd against than sinning? The intermediate system of schooling in Ireland 1878-1922' History of Education
 Walsh, B. 'Nobody Will Even Remember It': An Oral History of the Contribution of the Teaching Religious in Ireland (Part I) Studies: An Irish Quarterly Review 110 (437), 92–101. Part II 110 (438), 201-212 (2021). 
 Walsh, B. The "Haunting Silence": autobiographical accounts of secondary teaching in twentieth-century Ireland' Paedagogica Historica (2020)
 Walsh, B. (ed.) Essays in the History of Irish Education (Palgrave Macmillan, London, 2016)
 Walsh, B. 'I never heard the word methodology': personal accounts of teacher training in Ireland 1943–1980. June 2016 History of Education 46(3)
 B Walsh, 'Girls' perceptions of school in nineteenth-century Ireland', in B. Walsh (ed.), Knowing Their Place? The intellectual life of women in nineteenth-century Ireland, (Dublin, History Press, 2014)

Primary sources
 Hyland, Áine, and Kenneth Milne, eds. Irish educational documents: A selection of extracts from documents relating to the history of Irish education from the earliest times to 1922 (Church of Ireland College of Education, 1995)
 Hyland, Áine, and Kenneth Milne, eds. Irish educational documents. Vol. 2: a selection of extracts... relating to the history of education from 1922 to 1991 (Dublin, 1991).

External links
Central Statistics Office - Education Statistics
Irish Second-Level Students' Union, Connecting Students. Giving Students a Voice.
Higher Education Authority, Ireland
International Education Board Ireland
National Council for Curriculum and Assessment, Ireland
National Qualifications Authority of Ireland
The Sunday Times University Guide 2004 - Ireland
Learningireland.ie - Ireland's National Education Database
SchoolDays.ie - Online Resource for Parents and Teachers in Ireland
IrelandStats.com - Historical Information about Irish schools
The Teaching Council of Ireland